A51 may refer to:
 Area 51, the nickname for a military base in Nevada that is the subject of many conspiracy theories
 A51 Terrain Park (Colorado), a terrain park in Keystone, Colorado 
 A51 road (England), a road connecting Kingsbury and Chester
 A51 motorway (France), a road connecting Marseille and Grenoble
 A5/1, in cryptography, a stream cipher used in GSM cellular networks
 Samsung Galaxy A51, a smartphone released in 2019
 A51, one of the Encyclopaedia of Chess Openings codes for the Budapest Gambit in chess
 A-51, a Namibian hip hop band